Michel Pagel (born 1961) is a French science fiction and fantasy writer. He is also a translator. He was first published in the fanzine Espace-Temps in 1977. He is the writer of two series; Les Flammes de la nuit and La Comédie inhumaine, as well as several novels. He won the Prix Rosny-Aîné for L'équilibre des paradoxes, which is classed as an example of modern steampunk.

As a translator he translated Joe Haldeman's Forever Peace and Neil Gaiman's American Gods into French.

Bibliography

 Demain Matin au Chant du Tueur! [Tomorrow Morning When The Killer Sings] (Fleuve Noir Anticipation 1294, 1984)
 La Taverne de l'Espoir [The Inn Of Hope] (FNA 1305, 1984)
 Le Viêt-Nam au Futur Simple [Future Tense Vietnam] (FNA 1320, 1984)
 L'Ange du Désert [The Desert Angel] (FNA 1403, 1985)
 Les Flammes de la Nuit - Rowena [The Flames Of Night] (FNA 1433, 1986)
 La Ville d'Acier [The Steel City] (FNA 1457, 1986)
 Le Fou [The Madman] (FNA 1493, 1987)
 Les Cavaliers Dorés [The Golden Horsemen] (FNA 1513, 1987)
 Soleil Pourpre, Soleil Noir [Purple Sun, Black Sun] (FNA 1563, 1987)
 Pour Une Poignée d'Helix Pomatias [For A Fistful Of Helix Pomatias] (FNA 1628, 1988)
 Le Diable à Quatre [The Devil In Four] (FNA 1657, 1988)
 Sylvana  (FNA 1687, 1989)
 Désirs Cruels [Cruel Desires] (FNA 1725, 1989)
 Les Ailes Tranchées [The Sliced-Off Wings] (As Félix Chapel) (FNA 1739, 1990)
 Le Temple de la Mort Turquoise [The Temple Of The Purple Death] (As Félix Chapel) (FNA 1757, 1990)
 Le Sang de Fulgavy [The Blood Of Fulgavy] (As Félix Chapel) (FNA 1768, 1990)
 Les Ephémères des Sables [The Ephemerals Of The Sands] (As Félix Chapel) (FNA 1786, 1990)
 L'Antre du Serpent [The Lair Of The Serpent] (FNA 1794, 1990)
 Le Refuge de l'Agneau [The Refuge Of The Lamb] (FNA 1801, 1991)
 Les Fêtes de Hrampa [The Celebrations Of Hrampa] (As Félix Chapel) (FNA 1819, 1991)
 Le Cimetière des Astronefs [The Graveyard Of The Spaceships] (FNA 1833, 1991)
 Orages en Terre de France [Storms Over The Land Of France] (FNA 1851, 1991)
 Le Crâne du Houngan [The Skull Of The Houngan] (Fleuve Noir Aventures 2, 1995)
 L'Héritier de Soliman [The Heir Of Soliman] (FNAV 13, 1995)
 Nuées Ardentes [Fiery Clouds] (Étoiles Vives, 1997)

External links

1961 births
Living people
French science fiction writers
French fantasy writers
French male novelists
French speculative fiction translators
French male non-fiction writers